Sukhbir may refer to:

 Sukhbir (musician) (born 1969), Bhangra singer
 Sukhbir (writer) (1925–2012), Punjabi novelist, short-story writer, poet and essayist
 Sukhbir Singh Badal (born 1962), Punjabi politician
 Sukhbir Singh Gill (born 1975), former field hockey player
 Sukhbir Singh Kapoor, writer and educator
 Sukhbir Sinha (1868–1928), politician, zamindar and Hindu Mahasabha leader

Indian masculine given names